Diva Tarkas is an Indonesian footballer who currently plays for Persijap Jepara as a midfielder in the Indonesia Super League.

External links
 https://web.archive.org/web/20100611045444/http://www.goal.com/id-ID/people/indonesia/25925/diva-tarkas

Indonesian footballers
Living people
1987 births
Association football midfielders
Sportspeople from Makassar
Persijap Jepara players
PSM Makassar players